Winifred Evelyn Frost (2 March 1902-August 1979) was a freshwater biologist. Her research focused primarily on eels, minnows, pike, and char by observing fish in the wild. After some time as chair, Frost was then appointed president of the Windermere and District Angling Association.

Early life and education
From 1913 to 1916, Frost attended County Secondary School in Crewe, followed by Cowley Girls' School in St. Helens from 1917 to 1920. She earned her Bachelor of Science from Liverpool University from 1920 to 1923, as well as her Diploma of Education in 1924.

Career
Frost worked with Professor James Johnstone researching euphausids at Liverpool University, where she also earned her Master of Science in zoology in 1926. Starting in 1938, Frost worked as an assistant inspector studying trout in the River Liffey for the Fisheries Branch in Dublin. That same year, she became a research scientist for the Freshwater Biological Association. In 1945, the quality of her published work encouraged Liverpool University to grant Frost her Doctor of Science. Frost co-wrote The Trout, published in 1967 as part of the New Naturalist series, with Margaret E. Brown. The majority of the book was written in the late 1950s, but it took Frost and Brown, in all, 21 years to compile. Frost was also a member of the Council of Salmon and Trout Association, which facilitated her travel to central Africa where she studied eels. Frost remained a staff member at the Freshwater Biological Association until she died in 1979. She bequeathed most of her assets to the Freshwater Biological Association, which then created a scholarship to fund postgraduate students studying freshwater biology.

Publications

References

1902 births
1979 deaths
20th-century British biologists
20th-century British women scientists
Alumni of the University of Liverpool
British women biologists